The 'swimming events of the 1998 Commonwealth Games' were held at the National Aquatics Centre at the National Sports Complex, Malaysia from 12–17 September 1998.

Medalists

Men's events

Women's events

Medal table

See also
List of Commonwealth Games records in swimming

References
Commonwealth Games Federation Results Database
1998 XVI Commonwealth Games Kuala Lumpur Malaysia: Aquatics Results

1998
1998 in swimming
1998 Commonwealth Games events